A cyanohydrin reaction is an organic chemical reaction in which an aldehyde or ketone reacts with a cyanide anion or a nitrile to form a cyanohydrin. This nucleophilic addition is a reversible reaction but with aliphatic carbonyl compounds equilibrium is in favor of the reaction products. The cyanide source can be potassium cyanide, sodium cyanide or trimethylsilyl cyanide. With aromatic aldehydes such as benzaldehyde, the benzoin condensation is a competing reaction. The reaction is used in carbohydrate chemistry as a chain extension method for example that of D-xylose.

Examples

Reaction mechanism

Asymmetric synthesis 
The asymmetric cyanohydrin reaction of benzaldehyde with trimethylsilylcyanide is made possible by employment of (R)-Binol at 1–10% catalyst loading. This ligand firsts reacts with a lithium alkoxy compound to form a lithium binaphtholate Complex.

The chemist Urech in 1872 was the first to synthesize cyanohydrins from ketones with alkali cyanides and acetic acid and therefore this reaction also goes by the name of Urech cyanohydrin method. With HCN in acidic conditions – i.e. the cyanohydrin is the functional group CN–C–OH.

References

External links 
 Cyanohydrin reaction of formaldehyde to hydroxyacetonitrile or glycolonitrile with sodium cyanide in Organic Syntheses Coll. Vol. 2, p. 387; Vol. 13, p. 56 Article
 Cyanohydrin reaction of formaldehyde with potassium cyanide Organic Syntheses Coll. Vol. 3, p. 436; Vol. 27, p. 41 Article
 Cyanohydrin reaction of acetophenone with potassium cyanide Organic Syntheses Coll. Vol. 4, p. 58; Vol. 33, p. 7 Article
 Cyanohydrin reaction of D-xylose with potassium cyanide Organic Syntheses Coll. Vol. 4, p. 506; Vol. 36, p. 38 Article
 Cyanohydrin reaction of acetone with potassium cyanide Organic Syntheses Coll. Vol. 2, p. 7; Vol. 15, p. 1 Article
 Cyanohydrin reaction of benzoquinone with trimethylsilylcyanide Organic Syntheses Coll. Vol. 7, p. 517; Vol. 60, p. 126 Article

Nucleophilic addition reactions
Carbohydrate chemistry
Cyanohydrins